Jiří Novák and David Rikl were the defending champions but lost in the quarterfinals to Tomáš Cibulec and Leoš Friedl.

Joshua Eagle and Sandon Stolle won in the final 6–4, 6–4 against Daniel Nestor and Nenad Zimonjić.

Seeds

  Yevgeny Kafelnikov /  Max Mirnyi (semifinals)
  Jiří Novák /  David Rikl (quarterfinals)
  Joshua Eagle /  Sandon Stolle (champions)
  Daniel Nestor /  Nenad Zimonjić (final)

Draw

External links
 2001 Dubai Tennis Championships Doubles Draw

2001 Dubai Tennis Championships and Duty Free Women's Open
Doubles